Arbori is a commune in the Corse-du-Sud department of France on the island of Corsica.

The inhabitants of the commune are known as Arborais or Arboraises

Geography
Arbori is located in a direct line some 12 km south of Marignana and 20 km north of Sarrola-Carcopino. Access to the commune is by the road D1 which runs by a tortuous route north from Sari-d'Orcino through the commune to the village then continues north to Vico. Apart from the village there are also the hamlets of Mercolaccia and Parapoghiu. The commune is remote, mountainous, and heavily forested although with a small patch of farmland in the centre.

The eastern and southern border is formed by the river Liamone, which flows south and then west, from its confluence with the Cruzini.

Administration

List of Successive Mayors

Demography
In 2017 the commune had 54 inhabitants.

Sites and Monuments
The "Pont de Truja" (Truja Bridge) between Arbori and Lopigna (1809)  is registered as an historical monument.
The "Parish Church of the Assumption" contains a Statue: Virgin and child (19th century)  which is registered as an historical object.
The "Castaldu" was an old fortified chateau that was razed in 1489 by the Genoese.

Notable people linked to the commune
, poet.
Pierre Toussaint Leca (Petru Leca) (1879-1951 at Nice). Poet in the French and Corsican languages, founded L’Aloès, a Mediterranean Journal.

 (1445-1515), the last Count of Corsica.

See also
Communes of the Corse-du-Sud department

References

External links

Arbori on Géoportail, National Geographic Institute (IGN) website 

Communes of Corse-du-Sud